Amelia Ritchie (born 9 May 1999) is a Welsh footballer who plays as a defender. She has been a member of the Wales women's national team.

References

External links

1999 births
Living people
Welsh women's footballers
Women's association football defenders
Women's Championship (England) players
Brighton & Hove Albion W.F.C. players
Charlton Athletic W.F.C. players
Wales women's international footballers
Welsh expatriate footballers
Expatriate women's footballers in England